Sterling William Wallace Belliveau (born August 5, 1953) is a Canadian politician. Belliveau represented the electoral district of Shelburne (now Queens-Shelburne) in the Nova Scotia House of Assembly from 2006 to 2017 as a member of the Nova Scotia New Democratic Party.

Early life
Belliveau grew up in Woods Harbour, Nova Scotia and was previously a self-employed fisherman.

Political career

Municipal politics
Belliveau served for three terms as a municipal councillor representing District 1 (Charlesville, Forbes Point and Woods Harbour) on the municipal council for the Municipality of the District of Barrington; two of those terms he served as warden.

Provincial politics
In 2006 Belliveau successfully ran for the Nova Scotia New Democratic Party nomination in the constituency of Shelburne.  He was elected in the 2006 provincial election, defeating Progressive Conservative candidate Eddie Nickerson by 65 votes.  He was re-elected in the 2009 provincial election, receiving 55.41% of the votes and increasing his vote to 2,207 over his closest challenger.  Belliveau's riding was abolished in the 2012 electoral boundary review.  Belliveau was re-elected in the 2013 provincial election representing the new riding of Queens-Shelburne where he received 37.1% of the votes with a margin of 381 votes over his closest challenger.

On June 19, 2009, Belliveau was appointed to the Executive Council of Nova Scotia, serving as Minister of Fisheries and Aquaculture as well as Minister of Environment.  He served in the Executive Council until October 22, 2013.

In June 2016, Belliveau announced that he is not reoffering in the 2017 Nova Scotia general election.

Re-entry into provincial politics

On February 4, 2021, Belliveau announced he was seeking the Progressive Conservative nomination to run in his former seat as MLA in the reorganized constituency of Queens-Shelburne. In the previous year, Belliveau had re-entered the public view over the 2020 Mi'kmaq lobster dispute, at the time calling for a one-year pause to the Miꞌkmaq moderate livelihood fishery organized by the Sipekneꞌkatik First Nation. Belliveau was quoted as saying, "I can assure you the commercial industry feels they have not had an opportunity to have their voices heard at the table," indicating that he believed Mi'kmaq livelihood fishing affirmed under The Marshall Decision must be tied to the commercial fishing season. Acknowledging his shift from the NDP to Conservative, Belliveau noted he believed the switch would be more likely to result in a win for him, and stated that he was unhappy with the Federal NDP's stance on the ongoing fisheries issue, which contrary to Belliveau, supports an indigenous moderate livelihood fishery apart from the commercial season.

Personal life
He is married to Luella Jean (Cameron) and they have two adult children and one grandchild.

Electoral record

|-

|New Democratic Party
|Sterling Belliveau
|align="right"| 3,066
|align="right"| 37.10
|align="right"| N/A
|-

|Progressive Conservative
|Bruce Inglis
|align="right"| 2,685
|align="right"| 32.49
|align="right"| N/A
|-

|Liberal
|Benson Frail
|align="right"| 2,302
|align="right"| 27.86
|align="right"| N/A
|-

|Green
|Madeline Taylor
|align="right"| 211
|align="right"| 2.55
|align="right"| N/A
|}

|-

|New Democratic Party
|Sterling Belliveau
|align="right"|3844
|align="right"|55.41
|align="right"|
|-

|Progressive Conservative
|Eddie Nickerson
|align="right"|1637
|align="right"|23.59
|align="right"|
|-

|Liberal
|Darian Huskilson
|align="right"|1356
|align="right"|19.54
|align="right"|
|-

|}

|-

|New Democratic Party
|Sterling Belliveau
|align="right"|2438
|align="right"|36.27
|align="right"|
|-

|Progressive Conservative
|Eddie Nickerson
|align="right"|2373
|align="right"|35.00
|align="right"|
|-

|Liberal
|Kirk Cox
|align="right"|1790
|align="right"|26.63
|align="right"|
|-

|}

References

External links
 Members of the Nova Scotia Legislative Assembly

Canadian people of Acadian descent
Canadian fishers
Nova Scotia New Democratic Party MLAs
Living people
Members of the Executive Council of Nova Scotia
Place of birth missing (living people)
People from Shelburne County, Nova Scotia
Nova Scotia municipal councillors
21st-century Canadian politicians
1953 births